Kazanga Makok (born 12 December 1966) is a Congolese middle-distance runner. He competed in the men's 800 metres at the 1988 Summer Olympics.

References

External links
 

1966 births
Living people
Athletes (track and field) at the 1988 Summer Olympics
Democratic Republic of the Congo male middle-distance runners
Olympic athletes of the Democratic Republic of the Congo
Place of birth missing (living people)
21st-century Democratic Republic of the Congo people